Simon Boswell (born 15 October 1956) is a BAFTA-nominated British film score composer, conductor, producer and musician, with more than 100 credits to his name. He is known for combining mainly electronic elements with orchestral.

Biography
An alumnus of the independent The Haberdashers' Aske's Boys' School, Boswell studied English literature at Pembroke College, Cambridge. Playing the guitar since age 12, he was an accomplished guitarist and was signed by Transatlantic Records in 1975 whilst still at college. This led to the release of his first solo album, "The Mind Parasites", a collection of contemporary acoustic songs and instrumentals.
He formed the band "Advertising" in 1977, at the beginning of the punk rock era. Labelled "Power Pop," the band was more of an homage to the pop art style of Andy Warhol and the Velvet Underground. They toured extensively with Blondie.
After the split of "Advertising", Boswell became a record producer both in the United Kingdom and Italy. He produced Italian mega star Renato Zero's album and album of Nino Buonocore.  Boswell's record productions from the 1980s have influenced many contemporary musicians, notably the sample of the band 23 Skidoo's "Coup" which became The Chemical Brothers' "Block Rockin' Beats". After producing two albums for the London band Live Wire, he joined the band.

Film
Boswell's film career started in 1985, and since then he has countless awards from around the world and has been nominated twice for a BAFTA award.
Some Directors that Boswell has worked with include Danny Boyle, Michael Hoffman, Dario Argento, Clive Barker and Alejandro Jodorowsky. Genres of his work in film include Italian exploitation ("Phenomena", "Stage Fright"), contemporary thrillers ("Shallow Grave", "Hackers"), horror flicks ("Lord of Illusions", "Hardware"), romances and character studies ("Jack and Sarah", "This Year's Love", "Born Romantic"), dramas ("In My Father's Den", "The War Zone", "My Zinc Bed"), fantasies ("Santa Sagre", "Photographing Fairies", "Tin Man") and literary classics ("A Midsummer Night's Dream", "Cousin Bette"). He has also collaborated with many high-profile artists on his projects, such as Elton John, Dolly Parton and Marianne Faithfull.
Established as a live performer as well as working in recording studio, he is accomplished with electronic and rock genres, combining these with epic orchestral scores.

Boswell has also worked on two projects with the Vatican. "Santo Subito" was his first project, which was a film collaboration setting the speeches and the singing of Pope John Paul II to Boswell's music and visuals.
Boswell more recently composed for and produced the album "Alma Mater", featuring Pope Benedict XVI. The works on the album combine Gregorian chant along with Western art contemporary music and Middle-Eastern influences, and the album was launched officially at a concert in Westminster Cathedral in November 2009, featuring the Chamber Choir of the Philharmonic Academy of Rome and singer Yasemin Sannino.

TV
Boswell has composed for BAFTA nominated TV series The Lakes, and collaborated with film-maker Brian Hill and poet Simon Armitage on "Pornography: The Musical" and "Songbirds".

Music
Boswell has worked with musicians from bands such as Blur, Orbital, The Sex Pistols and Echo And The Bunnymen. In 1982 he produced and arranged the album Via Tagliamento 1965-1970 for the popular Italian singer and songwriter Renato Zero. His credits as arranger and producer also include albums by Amii Stewart, Tony Esposito, Tullio De Piscopo and Nino Buonocore.

In Autumn 2006, his album Close Your Eyes was released independently via his own Flick Records after 12 years of work.

Quote: "I cut up my previous scores into bits and re-assembled them as new songs mixing full orchestra with musicians from Blur and The Kills and spoken word parts for some of the actors and directors I have worked with along the way – including Ewan McGregor, Ray Winstone, Goran Visnij, Dario Argento and Alejandro Jodorowsky."

Art
Boswell continues to work on his own unique art project called BLINK!, an audio-visual installation looped to last forever of portraits extracted from news footage, and individually scored with their own soundtracks. This was first exhibited at the ICA in London in 2002 on 4 simultaneous cinema-sized screens.

Film credits

TV credits
2007
 Tin Man
 Nearly Famous (6 episodes)
 Catwalk Dogs
2006
 Jackanory (2 episodes)
 The Magician of Samarkand
 Muddle Earth
2004
 Sea of Souls (2 episodes)
2003
 Pornography: The Musical
2002
 Widows
2001
 Mind Games
2000
 Jason and the Argonauts
1999
 Tube Tales (segment "Bone")
1998
 Killer Net

Other music credits
2004
 In My Father's Den - Music Recordist
2003
 Octane - Soundtrack Producer
1999
 Women Talking Dirty - Music Arranger
 The Debtors - Conductor
1998
 Cousin Bette - Music Arranger and Producer
1994
 Second Best - Music Arranger
 Burn:Cycle - Soundtrack Producer
1987
 Fino alla morte (TV) - Music Arranger

Personal life

He married and divorced, having had a son named Jack; he lived with the actress Lysette Anthony and has a son by her, Jimi, born in 2004. In 2008 Jimi was diagnosed with juvenile arthritis and recovered after an operation a year later. Simon is now married to the contemporary fine artist Lg White which is also the lead singer in his band TheAnd, which are performing Simon's film score's Live.

References

External links
 
 HotHouse Music
 
 

People educated at Haberdashers' Boys' School
1956 births
Living people
English conductors (music)
British male conductors (music)
Musicians from London
English film score composers
English male film score composers
21st-century British conductors (music)
21st-century British male musicians
Varèse Sarabande Records artists